Feng Feng is the name of:

Fung Fung (1916–2000), Hong Kong actor
Feng Feng (footballer) (born 1968), Chinese footballer and team manager
Feng Feng (rower) (born 1971), Chinese rower

See also
Fengfeng (disambiguation) for places